Zoran Majkić  (born February 21, 1978) is a former Serbian professional basketball player.

References

External links
 

1978 births
Living people
Basketball League of Serbia players
KK Beobanka players
KK Beopetrol/Atlas Beograd players
KK Proleter Zrenjanin players
KK Kolubara players
Sportspeople from Zrenjanin
Serbian expatriate basketball people in Greece
Serbian expatriate basketball people in Iran
Serbian expatriate basketball people in Norway
Serbian expatriate basketball people in Slovenia
Serbian expatriate basketball people in North Macedonia
Serbian men's basketball players
Power forwards (basketball)